Jakob Nerwinski (born October 17, 1994) is an American professional soccer player who plays as a right-back for Major League Soccer club St. Louis City.

Early life
A native of the Lawrenceville section of Lawrence Township, Mercer County, New Jersey, Nerwinski played varsity soccer from his freshman through senior year at Notre Dame High School in Lawrenceville under coach Mike Perone. During each of his four years as a varsity starter he earned All-County honors and was named to All-State, All-Area, or All-Conference first teams at least once per season. During his senior season, Nerwinski broke Notre Dame's all-time scoring record with 21 goals and 19 assists.

Career

College
Nerwinski played four years of college soccer at the University of Connecticut between 2013 and 2016. During his time at UConn, Nerwinski was named in the American Athletic Conference First Team and the NSCAA First Team All-East Region for two consecutive years.

Professional
On January 13, 2017, Nerwinski was selected 7th overall in the 2017 MLS SuperDraft by Vancouver Whitecaps FC. He signed with the club on February 9, 2017.

Nerwinski made his professional debut on February 22, 2017 in a 1–1 draw with New York Red Bulls in the CONCACAF Champions League.

Following the 2022 season, Nerwinski's contract option was declined by Vancouver.

Nerwinski signed a two-year deal with St. Louis City on November 28, 2022, joining the club in their inaugural season in MLS in 2023.

Honors
Vancouver Whitecaps
Canadian Championship: 2022

Personal life
Born in the United States, Nerwinski is of Polish descent through his great-grandparents who arrived to the United States from Warsaw, Poland.

References

External links

 UConn profile
 Vancouver profile
 
 
 

1994 births
Living people
American people of Polish descent
American soccer players
Soccer players from New Jersey
Sportspeople from Mercer County, New Jersey
People from Lawrence Township, Mercer County, New Jersey
Notre Dame High School (New Jersey) alumni
Association football defenders
UConn Huskies men's soccer players
University of Connecticut alumni
Vancouver Whitecaps FC draft picks
Vancouver Whitecaps FC players
Whitecaps FC 2 players
Major League Soccer players
USL Championship players
American expatriate soccer players
Expatriate soccer players in Canada
American expatriate sportspeople in Canada